The Wilson Log House is an historic house in rural Macon County, North Carolina.  It is a single story log structure, located west of Highlands, on the west side of State Route 1621 (Hickory Gap Road), 1.4 miles northwest of its junction with Route 1620.  It was built c. 1882 by Jeremiah Wilson, and is one of a small number of period log buildings to survive in the county.  The house remained in the Wilson family until the 1950s.  It measures about 18' by 20', and is constructed from logs with dovetail joins, and red mud chinking.  Its interior consists of a single large chamber, with a stair rising on one side to a loft area under the gable roof.  At some point a frame addition was added to the rear of the house, but that has since been removed.

The house was listed on the National Register of Historic Places in 1998, at which time it was undergoing a historically sensitive restoration.

See also
National Register of Historic Places listings in Macon County, North Carolina

References

Log houses in the United States
Houses on the National Register of Historic Places in North Carolina
Houses completed in 1882
Houses in Macon County, North Carolina
National Register of Historic Places in Macon County, North Carolina
Log buildings and structures on the National Register of Historic Places in North Carolina